Poke, Poke salad, poke salat, or poke sallet may refer to:
 Poke (Hawaiian dish), a salad made from marinated raw fish
 Poke salad (aka poke salat or poke sallett), a dish prepared using Phytolacca americana

See also
 Poke (disambiguation)
 Polk Salad Annie